The New Adventures of Zorro is the third animated television series to feature the character of Zorro. The show was on the air for two seasons, from September 20, 1997 to December 12, 1998.

Plot
The show starred Michael Gough as Zorro/Diego de la Vega, with Earl Boen as Captain Montecero, the lead villain. Patrick Fraley played Diego's father, Don Alejandro de la Vega, and Tony Pope was the bumbling Sergeant Garcia, who was popularized by Henry Calvin on the 1950s Disney live-action series. This series added elements of science fiction and fantasy to the Zorro legend, with the hero battling supervillains who used steampunk gadgets and magic. Zorro employed similar equipment designed by his mute manservant, Bernardo, and was aided by the magic of the Native American wise woman, Grey Owl.

Cast 
 Michael Gough as Don Diego de la Vega / Zorro
 Jeannie Elias as Isabella Torres
 Earl Boen as Captain Montecero
 Tony Pope as Sergeant Garcia
 Patrick Fraley as Don Alejandro de la Vega

Additional voices
 Ed Asner
 Dee Bradley Baker
 Mary Kay Bergman
 Susan Blu
 Victor Brandt
 Clancy Brown
 Warren Burton
 Hamilton Camp
 Brian Cummings
 Daniel Davis
 Ronald Feinberg
 Ed Gilbert
 Jennifer Hale
 Mark Hamill
 Jess Harnell
 Sherman Howard
 Alan Oppenheimer
 Ron Perlman as Gomez Rudolfo
 Mark Rolston
 Rino Romano
 Neil Ross
 Kevin Schon
 Glenn Shadix
 Fred Wolf

Crew
 Susan Blu - Voice Director

Episodes

Season 1 (1997)

Season 2 (1998)

Home media
The show's first ten episodes were released on VHS in 1998 by Warner Home Video.

References

External links
 Zorro Productions, Inc.
 

1990s American animated television series
1997 American television series debuts
1998 American television series endings
Zorro television series
Television series by Warner Bros. Television Studios
American children's animated action television series
American children's animated adventure television series
American children's animated science fantasy television series
First-run syndicated television programs in the United States
Films based on works by Johnston McCulley